Para Ti 14 Exitos Originales is a compilation album released by Juan Gabriel in 1988.

Track listing

Album certification

References 

Juan Gabriel compilation albums
1988 albums